The Sharqiyin (singular Al Sharqi ) is a tribe of the United Arab Emirates (UAE).  

The Sharqiyin were long the dominant tribe along the East coast of the Trucial States (and the second most numerous in the area around the start of the 19th century), an area known as Shamailiyah. A 1968 census showed 90% of the tribal population of Fujairah was Sharqiyin. They were traditionally dependents of Sharjah and, over the centuries, made several attempts to secede and declare independence, finally practically managing this from 1901 onwards and finally gaining British recognition as a Trucial State, Fujairah, in 1952.

They settled all along the East Coast of the Trucial States, from Kalba to Dibba, as well as in the Wadi Ham and Jiri plain and by the turn of the 20th century they were some 7,000 strong. Three sections of the tribe are notable, the Hafaitat (from which the ruling family of Fujairah derives), the Yammahi and the Hamudiyin. After the Bani Yas, the Sharqiyin were the second most numerous tribe in the Trucial States.

Independence 

In 1879, the head of the Hafaitat, Sheikh Hamad bin Abdullah Al Sharqi, led an insurrection against Sheikh Saqr bin Khalid Al Qasimi of Sharjah, who claimed suzerainty over the Shamaliyah and had placed a slave named Sarur in charge of Fujairah. The insurrection replaced Sarur and a delegation was sent to Sheikh Saqr but they were badly received, imprisoned and a force sent back against the insurrectionists, taking Fujairah Fort and forcing Hamad bin Abdullah into exile. At the end of that year or possibly early 1880, Hamad returned from his exile and led a fresh bid to proclaim the independence of Fujairah, this time forcing a rout of Fujairah Fort, with eight men among the defenders killed.

The settlement of a peace was placed in front of the Ruler of Ras Al Khaimah to arbitrate and, in 1881, Hamad bin Abdullah signed a document confirming him as a dependent of Sharjah. However, he expanded his influence over the area, taking Al Bithnah Fort in a move which was to support his eventual declaration of independence from Sharjah in 1901, a move which enjoyed the recognition of this status by all concerned, with the sole exception of the British. Fujairah's status as a Trucial State was not formally recognised by the British until 1952.

Subsisting in the main on agriculture, pearling and fishing, the Sharqiyin lived a relatively harsh life, a fact underlined by a survey of the late 1960s, which showed the majority of households in the emirate of Fujairah still lived in barasti (palm frond) houses.

Conflict 
The Sharqiyin were frequently in conflict with their neighbours, particularly the Shihuh, Khawatir and Naqbiyin, but would make common cause with these against Sharjah whenever the opportunity arose.

The long history of squabbles and disputes between the Sharqiyn and neighbouring tribes came to the fore once again following the act of Union, when a land dispute with Kalba broke out into open fighting. In early 1972, the newly founded Union Defence Force was called in to take control of the fighting which, by the time the UDF moved in, had killed 22 and seriously injured a dozen more. The dispute was finally settled after mediation between Sheikh Rashid of Dubai and other Rulers and a statement announcing the settlement was sent out on 17 July 1972.

References 

Tribes of the United Arab Emirates
Arabic-language surnames